Bedfordshire was a constituency of the European Parliament located in the United Kingdom, electing one Member of the European Parliament by the first-past-the-post electoral system. Created in 1979 for the first elections to the European Parliament, it was abolished in 1984 and succeeded by Cambridge and Bedfordshire North and Bedfordshire South.

Boundaries

It consisted of the parliamentary constituencies of Bedford, Mid Bedfordshire, South Bedfordshire, Hemel Hempstead, Hitchin, Luton East, and Luton West.

When it was abolished in 1984, the subsequent seats were based on the parliamentary constituencies created by the 1983 boundary changes. The area covered by the new parliamentary constituencies of Mid Bedfordshire and North Bedfordshire became part of the Cambridge and Bedfordshire North constituency, while the new constituencies of South West Bedfordshire, Stevenage, West Hertfordshire, Luton North and Luton South were transferred to Bedfordshire South.

MEPs

Elections

References

External links
 David Boothroyd's United Kingdom Election Results 

European Parliament constituencies in England (1979–1999)
Politics of Bedfordshire
1979 establishments in England
1984 disestablishments in England
Constituencies established in 1979
Constituencies disestablished in 1984